Jodha Bai Mahal also known as Jodh Bai Mahal is the largest and most prominent palaces in Fatehpur Sikri commissioned by Mughal Emperor Akbar after 1569 for his favourite wife, Mariam-uz-Zamani, commonly known as  'Jodha bai' . This Mahal is the largest complex of the zenana (palace for women belonging to the royal household). It is a masterpiece of the fusion of Hindu and Persian architecture made with red sandstone.

History

Born as a Rajput princess, Mariam-uz-Zamani was married to Akbar in the year 1562 as a result of a political alliance between Akbar and her father, Raja Bharmal. She gradually became his favourite wife and was the first wife of Akbar to honour the royal household with an heir. In the year 1569, she gave birth to her third and first surviving child of Akbar, Prince Salim. Akbar shifted his capital from Agra to Fatehpur Sikri in acknowledgement of his faith in the efficacy of the holy man's prayer, Sheikh Salim Chisti, whose blessings he sought for the birth of an heir to his empire. The construction in Sikri started in 1569 and a grand palace was established for the empress and her newborn son, prince Salim. This was the biggest residential palace in the city, and to this day it stands, though in ruins, as a monument of Akbar's love for the Amber princess.

Architecture and ornamentation

Jodha Bai Palace was commissioned by Akbar in her honour and was the largest residential palace in his harem. It is also known as Raniwas and Zenani Dyodhi. It shows the Rajput influence and is built around a courtyard, with special care being taken to ensure privacy. This palace building consists of a rectangular block with a single magnificent gateway on the eastern side, which was protected by guard rooms, having triangular ceilings and other apartments. The gateway of the palace is situated on the east side and is very magnificent and is of typical Rajasthani architecture. It has a magnificent double-storey complex which is the Khawabgah of the palace.

It also has a Hindu temple and a tulsi math used by his Hindu wife for worship. This palace was internally also connected to the palace of Akbar. Several Hindu motifs have been used in the building alongside Lord Krishna depictions on the walls, which confirms that the occupant of the building was a Hindu lady.

This palace has distinct Gujarati and Rajasthani architectural patterns. Many motifs can be found in the interior like swans, elephants, parrots, Srivastava marks etc. There is a suite in the palace which served as a temple. It contains vedikas and other Hindu motifs. The suite has pillars with brackets. The western suite, which serves the purpose of the temple, contains beautiful curvilinear pillars with brackets. The superstructure of the building comprises chhatris, pillars with wall brackets, semicircular domes and several niches. The palace is built with red sandstone which also makes it very beautiful.

Gallery

See also
Jahangiri Mahal
Ibadat Khana
Panch Mahal

References

External links
Jodha Bai Palce in Fatehpur Sikri

Mariam-uz-Zamani
Fatehpur Sikri
Forts in Uttar Pradesh
Mughal architecture
Buildings and structures in Agra district
Sandstone buildings in India
Royal residences in India
Tourist attractions in Agra district
Archaeological monuments in Uttar Pradesh
Akbar
1659 establishments in the Mughal Empire